"Better Now" is a song by American rapper and singer Post Malone from his second studio album, Beerbongs & Bentleys (2018). It was written by Post Malone, Billy Walsh, Louis Bell and Frank Dukes, with production handled by the latter two. The song was released to UK contemporary hit radio on May 25, 2018, and US contemporary hit radio on June 5, 2018, as the album's fifth and final single. It has reached the top 10 of the music charts in the United States, the United Kingdom, Australia, Ireland, and New Zealand. The song was nominated for Best Pop Solo Performance at the 61st Annual Grammy Awards.

Chart performance
"Better Now" debuted in the top ten in various countries, including at number one in Norway, number seven in the United States, and number six in the United Kingdom, becoming his third top 10 in the latter country. The single became his fifth top 10 hit in Australia, peaking at number two. It peaked at number 3 in the United States (prevented from further chart movement by Juice WRLD's "Lucid Dreams" as well as Maroon 5 and Cardi B's "Girls Like You").

Taylor Swift told Malone that she thought the song was good, especially its hook.

Music video
The official music video for "Better Now" premiered on October 5, 2018.

Charts

Weekly charts

Year-end charts

Decade-end charts

Certifications

!scope="col" colspan="3"|Streaming
|-

Release history

References

2018 singles
2018 songs
Black-and-white music videos
Post Malone songs
Songs written by Frank Dukes
Songs written by Louis Bell
Songs written by Post Malone
Number-one singles in Norway
Number-one singles in Sweden
Song recordings produced by Louis Bell
Republic Records singles